The COST Hata model is a radio propagation model (i.e. path loss) that extends the urban Hata model (which in turn is based on the Okumura model) to cover a more elaborated range of frequencies (up to 2 GHz). It is the most often cited of the COST 231 models (EU funded research project ca. April 1986 – April 1996), also called the Hata Model PCS Extension. This model is the combination of empirical and deterministic models for estimating path loss in an urban area over frequency range of 800 MHz to 2000 MHz.

COST (COopération européenne dans le domaine de la recherche Scientifique et Technique) is a European Union Forum for cooperative scientific research which has developed this model based on experimental measurements in multiple cities across Europe.

Applicable to / under conditions
This model is applicable to macro cells in urban areas. To further evaluate Path Loss in suburban or rural (quasi-)open areas, this path loss has to be substituted into Urban to Rural / Urban to Suburban Conversions. (Ray GAO, 09 Sep 2007)

Coverage
Frequency: 1500–2000 MHz
Mobile station antenna height: 1–10 m
Base station antenna height: 30–200 m
Link distance: 1–20 km

Mathematical formulation
The COST Hata model is formulated as,

where,

Limitations
This model requires that the base station antenna is higher than all adjacent rooftops.

See also
 Hata model
 Radio propagation model

References

Radio frequency propagation model